The judiciary of Uruguay is a branch of the government of Uruguay that interprets and applies the laws of Uruguay, to ensure equal justice under law, and to provide a mechanism for dispute resolution. The legal system of Uruguay is a civil law system, with public law based on the 1967 Constitution, amended in 1989, 1994, 1997, and 2004. The Constitution declares Uruguay to be a democratic republic, and separates the government into three equal branches, executive, legislative and judicial. Private relationships are subject to the Uruguayan Civil Code, originally published in 1868. The Constitution defines the judiciary as a hierarchical system courts, with the highest court being a five-member Supreme Court, who are appointed by the legislative branch of the government, for ten-year terms. The Supreme Court appoints the judges of most of the lower courts. Below the Supreme Court, there are sixteen courts of appeal, each of which has three judges. Seven of the courts of appeal specialize in civil matters, four specialize in criminal matters, three cover labour law, and two focus on family matters. At the lowest tier are justices of the peace and courts of first instance specialized in administrative, civil, criminal, customs, juvenile, and labour cases. Although the hierarchy, all of them are functionally and structurally impartial, that is, the tribunal should not be interested in the object of the particular case, and the higher tribunal does not impose a behaviour nor precedent to the lower ones. There are also separate courts for auditing, elections and the military.

Elections in Uruguay are organized and supervised by a permanent and independent Electoral Court, which was established by an electoral law that was drafted in 1924, and was included in the 1932 constitution. The court has nine members of which five are non-partisan members elected by the parliament, the General Assembly of Uruguay. The other four members represent the major political parties in the General Assembly and are each selected by the legislators of their own parties. Below the Electoral Court are nineteen departmental electoral boards.

The Judiciary of Uruguay is possibly the most independent in Latin America, in part due to having its own budget. However, between 1977 and 1985, the military government severely curtailed the independence of the judiciary, by placing the judiciary under a justice ministry. In 1985, the Supreme Court reasserted judicial independence by releasing members of the Tupamaros urban guerrilla group, who had been imprisoned in the seventies. Between 1905 and 1977, and from 1989 onwards, the selection of judges involved the legislature rather than the executive branch of government. Since 1997, it has been possible for Supreme Court judges to be re-elected after a gap of five years but only up to the age of 70.

See also
Supreme Court of Uruguay
Politics of Uruguay

References

External links

 
Government of Uruguay